Justin "J-Po" Ponsor (April 20, 1977 – May 18, 2019) was an American comics colorist.

Ponsor was born in San Diego, California. After graduating from Palomar College, Ponsor began his professional career in 1996, working for WildStorm as an in-house colorist. He went freelance in 2000 and was one of the first creatives at CrossGen in 2002. In 2005, he began coloring almost exclusively for Marvel. His work on Avengers earned him a nomination for a Golden Issue Award by ComicBook.com in 2018.

Ponsor died on May 18, 2019, after a two-year battle with cancer. He continued working up until his death.

References

External links
 
Overview from ComicVine
Entry in the Grand Comics Database

1977 births
2019 deaths
20th-century American artists
21st-century American artists
American comics artists
Artists from San Diego
Place of death missing
Comics colorists
Comics inkers
DC Comics people
Deaths from cancer in the United States
Marvel Comics people
Palomar College alumni